The 2015 ICC Under-19 World Cup Qualifier was an international cricket tournament played in Malaysia from 14 to 22 October 2015, forming part of the 2015–16 international season. The tournament was originally going to be held in Nepal, but was moved to Malaysia due to the April 2015 earthquake. Nepal defeated Ireland in the tournament final to qualify for the 2016 Under-19 World Cup in Bangladesh. In January 2016, Australia withdrew their team from the World Cup and Ireland, as runners-up in the qualifier, replaced them.

Teams
The second-placed teams at each of the five regional qualifying tournaments progressed to the qualifier:
  – runner-up in 2014 ACC Under-19 Premier League
  – runner-up in 2015 EAP Under-19 Cricket Trophy
  – runner-up in 2015 ICC Africa Under-19 Championship Division One
  – runner-up in 2015 ICC Americas Under-19 Championship
  – runner-up in 2015 ICC Europe Under-19 Championship

Squads

Round-robin

Finals

Third-place playoff

Final

Statistics

Most runs
The top five run scorers (total runs) are included in this table.

Source: ESPNcricinfo

Most wickets

The top five wicket takers are listed in this table, listed by wickets taken and then by bowling average.

Source: ESPNcricinfo

Final standings

References

External links
 Series home at ESPN Crincfo

2016 ICC Under-19 Cricket World Cup
International cricket competitions in 2015–16
ICC Under-19 Cricket World Cup Qualifier
International cricket competitions in Malaysia
Sport in Kuala Lumpur
Qualification for cricket competitions